The 2006 NBA All-Star Game was played on Sunday, February 19, 2006 at the Toyota Center in Houston, home of the Houston Rockets. The game was the 55th annual All-Star game. The theme song was by Houston native Chamillionaire who made a new version of his hit "Turn It Up." Trailing by 21 points, the East rode the hot shooting of LeBron James and the teamwork of the four All-Stars from the Detroit Pistons to a 122–120 victory over the West. The 21-year-old James, who scored 29 points and grabbed six rebounds, became the youngest player to win MVP. With the score tied, Dwyane Wade, who finished with 20 points, hit the game-winning layup with 16 seconds left. Tracy McGrady of the Houston Rockets led all players with a game-high 36 points.

Players

 Jermaine O'Neal was unable to participate due to injury.
 Gilbert Arenas was named as O'Neal's replacement.
 Vince Carter was named as starter, replacing O'Neal.

Coaches
The Eastern Conference team was coached by Flip Saunders of the Detroit Pistons, along with Sidney Lowe, Ron Harper and Don Zierden as assistant coaches. Ted Arzonico of the Orlando Magic was the athletic trainer.

The Western Conference team was coached by Avery Johnson of the Dallas Mavericks. Del Harris, Rolando Blackman and Joe Prunty served as assistant coaches, while Keith Jones of the Houston Rockets was the athletic trainer.

T-Mobile Rookie Challenge
The T-Mobile Rookie challenge was played on Friday, February 17, 2006 with the Sophomores beating the Rookies 106–96. Andre Iguodala was named MVP with a game-high 30 points.

* Did not participate due to injury.
Delonte West replaced Jameer Nelson (sprained right foot).

Coaches
The Rooks were coached by Sidney Lowe of the Detroit Pistons, along with Elvin Hayes as the assistant coach.

The Sophomores were coached by Del Harris of the Dallas Mavericks, along with Moses Malone as the assistant coach.

Foot Locker Three-Point Shootout
Dirk Nowitzki won with a score of 18, beating Gilbert Arenas and Ray Allen in the final round.

* Did not participate due to a family illness. Gilbert Arenas replaced Raja Bell.

Sprite Rising Stars Slam Dunk Contest
Nate Robinson won, beating Andre Iguodala in a dunk-off after the first ever tie in a Slam Dunk Contest. Robinson's win was highly questioned as he had missed several dunks and many speculate that Robinson was only awarded the title because of his small stature.

PlayStation Skills Challenge
Dwyane Wade won, beating LeBron James in the final round. Dwyane Wade won with a time of 26.1 seconds.

RadioShack Shooting Stars Competition
The San Antonio team won the competition with a time of 25.1 seconds.

References

National Basketball Association All-Star Game
Basketball competitions in Houston
All-Star
NBA All-Star Game
NBA All-Star Game
NBA All-Star Game